Raimundo Lira (born December 16, 1943) is a Brazilian politician. He has represented Paraíba in the Federal Senate since 2014. Previously, he was a Paraíba senator from 1987 to 1995. He is a member of the Brazilian Democratic Movement Party.

References

Living people
1943 births
Brazilian Democratic Movement politicians
Members of the Federal Senate (Brazil)